Monterville is an unincorporated community in Randolph County, West Virginia, United States. Monterville had a post office, which closed on June 20, 2009.

John Ernest Monterville Bing, an early postmaster, gave the community his name.

References

Unincorporated communities in Randolph County, West Virginia
Unincorporated communities in West Virginia